Kevin Francis Xavier Heath (born 24 March 1950) is a former Australian rules footballer who played with Hawthorn and Carlton in the VFL during the 1970s.
Kevin was also the only AFL Player to be a Cleo Centrefold in May 1978.

Hawthorn
Hawthorn recruited Heath while he was still a student at Assumption College, Kilmore. Heath was an outstanding junior athlete. Heath made his senior debut at the end of 1968 as an 18-year-old.  He soon became one of the regulars in the team. His career high point was when he was one of the Hawks’ best players in the 1971 VFL Grand Final.

Heath could play forward or back and represented Victoria on two occasions.

He lost his spot in the side in the middle of 1975 due to injury. He asked for a clearance to another club when the club refused to offer more money.

Carlton
Heath was cleared to Carlton and easily slotted into their backline. He gave good service for four years before he found himself surpassed by younger players. He retired at the end of 1980.

References

External links

1950 births
Australian rules footballers from Victoria (Australia)
Hawthorn Football Club players
Hawthorn Football Club Premiership players
Carlton Football Club players
Living people
One-time VFL/AFL Premiership players